José Raúl Delgado Díez  (born August 25, 1960) is a Cuban baseball player and Olympic gold medalist. Delgado is a one time gold medalist for baseball, winning at the 1992 Summer Olympics. He is the uncle of Lourdes Gourriel, and the granduncle of Yulieski Gourriel.

External links
Olympic Info
 

1960 births
Living people
Olympic baseball players of Cuba
Baseball players at the 1992 Summer Olympics
Olympic gold medalists for Cuba
Olympic medalists in baseball

Medalists at the 1992 Summer Olympics
Central American and Caribbean Games gold medalists for Cuba
Competitors at the 1990 Central American and Caribbean Games
Competitors at the 1993 Central American and Caribbean Games
Pan American Games medalists in baseball
Pan American Games gold medalists for Cuba
Baseball players at the 1991 Pan American Games
Central American and Caribbean Games medalists in baseball
Medalists at the 1991 Pan American Games
20th-century Cuban people